Vriesea interrogatoria is a plant species in the genus Vriesea. This species is endemic to Brazil.

References

interrogatoria
Flora of Brazil